Homer Central Schools is a school district serving Homer, New York.

Administration
 Superintentant: Thomas Turck 
 Principal of the High School(9-12): Douglas VanEtten 
 Vice Principal of the High School: James McGory
 Principal of the Junior High School(7-8): Kara Schneider
 Principal of the Intermediate School(3-6): Stephanie Falls 
 Principal of the Elementary School(K-2): Douglas A. Pasquerella

Athletics
 Athletic Director: Todd Lisi
 Boys: Football, Soccer, Cross Country, Basketball, Wrestling, Bowling, Hockey, Jousting, Indoor Track, Track, Lacrosse, Baseball, Tennis, Golf
 Girls: Soccer, Cross Country, Field Hockey, Volleyball, Bowling, Cheerleading, Basketball, Indoor Track, Track, Lacrosse, Softball, Tennis, Golf

References

External links
 

School districts in New York (state)
Education in Cortland County, New York